Brent Bailey is an American film and television actor, director, producer, and screenwriter born in Tucson, Arizona. Bailey has appeared in television series such as Criminal Minds, Rizzoli & Isles and Hart of Dixie. Bailey also played Alex Knightley in the webseries Emma Approved, which won a Primetime Emmy Award for Outstanding Original Interactive Program in 2015. He played John F. Kennedy's speechwriter Ted Sorensen in the film LBJ, directed by Rob Reiner.

Filmography

 The Boys & Girls Guide to Getting Down (2006) as Kissing Guy
 Fear Is a Lot Like Love (2006 short) as Sunbather
 The Last Sentinel (2007) as Action Drone
 Waiting (2007 short) as College Guy #1
 Privileged (1 episode, 2008) as Antione
 Life (1 episode 2009) Andy Diller
 Suspension of Disbelief (2009 Short) as Sam
 Leaving Bliss (8 episodes, 2009) as Madison
 Life with Kat & McKay (1 episode, 2009) as Thor
 Relish (2009) as Mike
 It's Not About Coffee (2010) as Chris
 Ship in a Bottle (2010) as The Captain
 Continental Divide (2010 Short) as Will
 We're Not Together (2011) as Brandon
 Going Down in LA-LA Land (2011) as Dean
 Think Like a Man (2012) as Waiter
 Love-Stupid (2 episodes, 2012) as Derek
 Whitney (1 episode, 2013) as Matt
 Threshold (2013) as Alex
 My Synthesized Life (11 episodes, 2013) as Jimmy Bales
 The Republic of Two (2013) as Tim
 Crimson Winter (2013) as Fearghas
 Criminal Minds (1 episode, 2013) as Scotty Delfino
 Precipitation (2014) as Jordan
 Vid_687337 (2014) as David (and as director)
 Emma Approved (52 episodes, 2013–2014) as Alex Knightley
 Ru (2014) as Justin G.
 Classic Alice (2 episodes, 2014) as Anthony White, Hot TA
 Hart of Dixie (1 episode, 2014) as Zack
 Passport (2014) as Jimmy
 Bella and the Bulldogs (1 episode, 2015) as Bella's Dad
 Rizzoli & Isles (1 episode, 2015) as Tony
 Karma's a B*Tch - The Series (1 episode, 2015) as Chuck
 Soundproof (2015) as Andy
 Palo Alto (2 episodes, 2015) as Sam Cohen
 Her Dinner Party (2015) as Benjamin
 LBJ (2016) as Ted Sorensen
 Agents of S.H.I.E.L.D. (2 episodes, 2018) as Agent Thomas
 Coop & Cami Ask the World (1 episode, 2019) as Eric Wrather
 A Cape Cod Christmas as Christian (December 4, 2021)
 Maggie as Spencer (July 6, 2022)
 The Holiday Dating Guide as Michael (December 17, 2022)

As writer/director/producer
 Vid_687337 (2014) as David (also as cinematographer. editor)
 Kids with Adult Problems (12 episodes, 2014)

Recognition

Awards and nominations
 2014, Indie Series Awards nomination as 'Best Lead Actor' for My Synthesized Life
 2014, Streamy Awards nomination for 'Best Male Actor in a Comedy Web Series' for Emma Approved
 2014, International Academy of Web Television award co-nomination for 'Best Ensemble Performance' for Emma Approved

References

External links
 
 
 

American male television actors
21st-century American male actors
Living people
Year of birth missing (living people)